Putra Safin Group Pati and previously knows as Putra Sinar Giri Football Club was an Indonesian football club based in Pati, Central Java and play their home match at Gelora Soekarno Mojoagung Stadium.

History
In 2014, Putra Ijen FC was established in Jember to participate in the competition in Liga 3 East Java.

In 2018, Putra Sinar Giri FC began participating in the East Java League 3 competition after buying a license from the club from Jember, Putra Ijen FC. PSG Gresik joined Liga 3 East Java in 2018 after buying license of Putra Ijen, club from Jember.
They won Liga 3 East Java for the first time in their history after beating Perseta Tulungagung 5–3 in penalty shootout.

In 2020, PSG Pati began participating in the competition in Liga 2 after Saiful Arifin buying license the club from Gresik, Putra Sinar Giri FC.

In 2021, Atta Halilintar and Putra Siregar buying the majority stake of PSG Pati and change the club name to AHHA PS Pati.

Honours
 Liga 3 East Java
 Champions (1): 2019

References

External links 

 PSG Pati - Colour of Logo
 PSG Pati - Kembang Joyo Warriors
 PSG Pati - The Juwana Milkfish

Football clubs in Indonesia
Football clubs in Central Java
2014 establishments in Indonesia
Association football clubs established in 2014